White Goat Island ("Island of the White Goat") is a small island off the north shore of Lough Corrib, close to Cornamona, in County Galway, Ireland. The three acre island was named after the prominent quartzite rock found on the south-west shore of the island.

References
 http://places.galwaylibrary.ie/asp/fullresult.asp?id=19332

Islands of County Galway
Gaeltacht places in County Galway
Lake islands of Ireland